General Sir Edward Kerrison, 1st Baronet,  (30 July 1776 – 9 March 1853) was a British Army officer and politician.

Kerrison was a Lieutenant-Colonel in the 7th Light Dragoons, saw service during the Peninsular War and commanded his regiment at the Battle of Waterloo.

Along with Charles Wetherell, he petitioned parliament over electoral malpractice in the parliamentary elections for Shaftesbury, Dorset.

Kerrison was the only son of Matthias Kerrison (1742–1827), who was a prosperous merchant and property investor, and his wife, Mary née Barnes. He was born at his father's property, Hoxne Hall, near Bungay, Suffolk, on 30 July 1776.

Marriage and issue

At St George's Church, Hanover Square, London, on 20 Oct 1810, Edward Kerrison married Mary Martha Ellice, a daughter of Alexander Ellice, a merchant who had made a fortune in the North American fur trade and transatlantic slave trade. Thus he had as a brother-in-law Edward Ellice, merchant and politician in Earl Grey's government. He had the following issue:
Sir Edward Kerrison, 2nd Baronet, son and heir;
 Anna Kerrison, who married John Henniker-Major, 4th Baron Henniker in 1836.
 Emily-Harriet Kerrison, who married Philip Stanhope, 5th Earl Stanhope in 1834.
 Agnes-Burrell Kerrison, who married William Bateman-Hanbury, 2nd Baron Bateman on 13May 1854.

Notes

External links 
 

Baronets in the Baronetage of the United Kingdom
British Army generals
British Army personnel of the Napoleonic Wars
Knights Commander of the Order of the Bath
Members of the Parliament of the United Kingdom for English constituencies
UK MPs 1812–1818
UK MPs 1818–1820
UK MPs 1820–1826
UK MPs 1826–1830
UK MPs 1830–1831
UK MPs 1831–1832
UK MPs 1832–1835
UK MPs 1835–1837
UK MPs 1837–1841
UK MPs 1841–1847
UK MPs 1847–1852
1776 births
1853 deaths
6th (Inniskilling) Dragoons officers
7th Queen's Own Hussars officers
People from Hoxne